Chief Caddo is the name of the statue formerly given to the winner of the annual football game between Southland Conference members Northwestern State University (NSU) of Natchitoches, Louisiana and Stephen F. Austin State University (SFA) of Nacogdoches, Texas. Northwestern State University stopped participating in the exchange in 2021 after a Student Government Association and Faculty Senate joint resolution recognizing that Caddo Nation officials stated the statue was offensive, acknowledging the statue was inauthentic, and calling for the end to the practice.

History
The idea of the statue was created in 1960 when longtime rivals NSU and SFA decided to award the winner of the game a trophy. The two schools settled on a wooden statue (both schools are located in heavily forested areas) supposedly representing an American Indian "chief" who, in European-American folklore originating in the 1930s, was responsible for settling the locations that became the cities in which university was located (both of which are named for branches of the tribe).  Under the agreement, based on the results of the 1961 football game, the losing school would chop down a tree from one of its nearby forests, while the winning school would receive the log and carve the statue from it.

NSU won the 1961 game 35–19; thus, SFA delivered a 2,000-pound black gum log to NSU. Woodcarver Harold Green spent some 230 hours fashioning the statue. It was named "Chief Caddo," supposedly after the Native nation that first settled the two communities.

In June 2010, after years of transportation to and from games had left "Chief Caddo" in poor condition, the trophy was given a much-needed refurbishing. The project, headed by Bill Flynn (Flynn Paint & Decorating of Nacogdoches), undertook the restoration of the trophy. Among the many restorations to the trophy were: the repairing of the base, the construction and replacement of feathers in the headdress, the restaining and repainting of the entire trophy, and intricate detailing.

NSU and SFA played for this trophy from 1961 to 2019.

Currently, the statue resides at Stephen F. Austin State University after their 2019 32–20 victory against the Demons.

Importance of the Caddo Nation
The Caddo Nation are the Native people whose lands included Natchitoches and Nacogdoches at the time of contact.

Nacogdoches and Natchitoches both received their names from Caddo band names.  Two apocryphal non-Caddo folk stories exist about how the cities got their names.   Both versions of folk story agree that a Caddo chief with two sons sent one east and the other west, and they traveled the same distance and established villages. As for the folklore in question:

One version, as reported by historian Samuel Stewart Mims in "Rio Sabinas", credits the chief of an Adae Indian village on the Sabine River. The village was overpopulated and the chief ordered his two grown sons to report to him precisely at sunrise. He told one son to walk east and the other to walk west until the very moment of sunset. The sons were to establish a village at the place they reached. The son who went west wound up in a grove of persimmon trees, and named his village Nacogdoches, meaning persimmon. The eastbound son reached a grove of papaw trees and named his village Natchitoches, meaning papaw.

Another version says that the chief had twin sons, Nacogdoches and Natchitoches, and could not decide who would lead the tribe following his death. The chief split the tribe between them and sent each in different directions. They traveled for three days, one eastbound and one westbound, and wound up where the cities are located today.

Game results

See also 
 List of NCAA college football rivalry games

References

Northwestern State Demons football
Stephen F. Austin Lumberjacks football
College football rivalry trophies in the United States